Danava is the debut album released by psychedelic rock band Danava. It was released on October 31, 2006 by Kemado Records on CD and LP.

Track listing 
 "By the Mark" – 7:49
 "Eyes in Disguise" – 12:53
 "Quiet Babies Astray in a Manger" – 6:19
 "Longdance" – 7:59
 "Maudie Shook" – 9:53

Personnel 
 Dusty Sparkles - guitars, vocals, synthesizers
 Dell Blackwell - bass
 Buck Rothy - drums

References 

2006 debut albums
Danava (band) albums